Lake Village is a census-designated place (CDP) in Lake Township, Newton County, in the U.S. state of Indiana. The population was 765 at the 2010 census.

History
Lake Village was laid out in 1876. The town did not grow much until the railroad was built through it in 1905. A post office has been in operation at Lake Village since 1876.

Geography

Demographics

As of the census of 2000, there were 855 people, 292 households, and 221 families residing in the CDP. The racial makeup of the CDP was 93.22% White, 0.12% African American, 1.87% Native American, 0.23% Asian, 2.57% from other races, and 1.99% from two or more races. Hispanic or Latino of any race were 3.74% of the population.

There were 292 households, out of which 38.7% had children under the age of 18 living with them, 59.2% were married couples living together, 12.0% had a female householder with no husband present, and 24.0% were non-families. 17.5% of all households were made up of individuals, and 8.9% had someone living alone who was 65 years of age or older. The average household size was 2.93 and the average family size was 3.33.

In the CDP, the population was spread out, with 29.9% under the age of 18, 9.4% from 18 to 24, 30.5% from 25 to 44, 20.6% from 45 to 64, and 9.6% who were 65 years of age or older. The median age was 34 years. For every 100 females, there were 96.1 males. For every 100 females age 18 and over, there were 96.4 males.

The median income for a household in the CDP was $39,474, and the median income for a family was $50,179. Males had a median income of $50,161 versus $21,688 for females. The per capita income for the CDP was $17,280. About 2.6% of families and 5.2% of the population were below the poverty line, including 1.7% of those under age 18 and 10.5% of those age 65 or over.

Education
Lake Village has a public library, a branch of the Newton County Public Library.

References

Census-designated places in Newton County, Indiana
Census-designated places in Indiana
Northwest Indiana